Level or levels may refer to:

Engineering
Level (instrument), a device used to measure true horizontal or relative heights
Spirit level, an instrument designed to indicate whether a surface is horizontal or vertical
Canal pound or level
Regrading or levelling, the process of raising and/or lowering the levels of land
Storey or level, a vertical unit of a building or a mine
Level (coordinate), vertical position
Horizontal plane parallel

Gaming
Level (video games), a stage of the game
Level (role-playing games), a measurement of character development

Music
Level (music), similar to but more general and basic than a chord
Levels (album), an album by AKA
"Levels" (Avicii song)
"Levels" (Bilal song)
"Levels" (Nick Jonas song)
"Levels" (Meek Mill song)
"Level" (The Raconteurs song)
"Levels" (NorthSideBenji song), featuring Houdini

Places
Level Mountain, a volcano in northern British Columbia, Canada
Levél, Győr-Moson-Sopron, Hungary
Levels, New Zealand
Level, Ohio, United States
Level Valley
Levels, West Virginia

Science and mathematics
A quantity, generally
Level (logarithmic quantity), a logarithmic measure defined as the logarithm of a ratio of two like quantities
Level, the different values that a categorical variable can have
Level, the different values that a factor can have in factor analysis
Level, the different treatments that are applied within a factor in the design of experiments

Other uses
Level (airline), a pan-European airline brand
LeveL, a games magazine in the Czech Republic, Romania, and Turkey
The Level, Brighton, a park in Brighton, UK
Level Vodka, a brand of vodka
Level, a collection of objects with the same rank in an overlapping hierarchy
Level, a layer of defense in two-level defense in American football
Level, an indication of the number of previous posts to a forum thread
LEVEL, a website for men of color published by Medium
The Level (TV series)

People with the surname
Annick Level (born 1942), French fencer
Calvin Levels (born 1954), American film actor
Dwayne Levels (born 1979), American football player
Janou Levels (born 2000), Dutch footballer
Léon Level (1910–1949), French professional road bicycle racer
Maurice Level (1875–1926), French writer
Tobias Levels (born 1986), German-Dutch footballer

See also
A-Scale Sound Level
Biological organisation
Derived no-effect level
Energy levels, discrete amounts of energy that can be held by a quantum mechanical system or confined particle
Flesch-Kincaid Grade Level
GCE Ordinary Level
Gal Level, an R&B girl duo from Windhoek, Namibia
ILR scale, descriptions of abilities to communicate in a language
Level crossing, a place where track and road meet at the same level
Level 3 (disambiguation)
Level 42, an English pop rock and jazz-funk band
Level measurement, instrumentation techniques to measure height within a vessel
Level of measurement, a theory of the kinds of scales or levels used for measuring
Level playing field, a concept about fairness where all play by the same set of rules
Level set, a set where a function takes on a given constant value
Leveling (disambiguation)
Leveling seat
Levellers
Pevensey Levels
Sea level, the average height of the ocean's surface, reference of height systems
Somerset Levels
Terror Alert Level
Water level, the average height of a water